Acacia huegelii is a shrub belonging to the genus Acacia and the subgenus Phyllodineae native to Western Australia.

Description
It produces cream-yellow flowers from October to February. The simple inflorescences are arranged with one per axil. The globular flowerhead contain 20 to 35 cream or white coloured flowers. Following flowering flat curved red-brown seed pods form that are up to  4long with a width of  containing oblong mottled seeds.

Taxonomy
The species was first formally described by the botanist George Bentham in 1837 as part of the work by Bentham, Stephan Endlicher, Eduard Fenzl and Heinrich Wilhelm Schott entitled Enumeratio plantarum quas in Novae Hollandiae ora austro-occidentali ad fluvium Cygnorum et in Sinu Regis Georgii collegit Carolus liber baro de Hügel. It was reclassified in 2003 as Racosperma huegelii by Leslie Pedley then transferred back to the genus Acacia in 2006. The only other synonym is Acacia huegelii Benth. var. huegelii.

The species names honours Carl Alexander Anselm, Baron von Hugel, an Austrian naturalist who visited Western Australia in 1833 and collected the type specimen from around the Swan River.

A. huegelii is closely related to Acacia forrestiana and has similar phyllodes to Acacia imparilis.

Distribution
It is native to an area along the south coast in the Peel and South West regions of Western Australia where it is found on low ridges, flats and sand dunes growing in lateritic gravel or sandy soils. It is often part of Banksia or Eucalyptus woodlands or open forest communities in northern and eastern areas but in south western areas it appears in dune swales with Agonis flexuosa and species of Kunzea.

See also
List of Acacia species

References

External links
Acacia huegelii Google images
Acacia huegelii World wide wattles

huegelii
Acacias of Western Australia
Plants described in 1837
Taxa named by George Bentham